The women's road race competition of the cycling events at the 2019 Pan American Games was held on August 10 at the Circuito San Miguel.

Schedule

Results
36 riders from 16 countries was started

References

Cycling at the 2019 Pan American Games
2019 in women's road cycling
Road cycling at the Pan American Games